The Greeks are an ethnic group native to Greece.

The term Greeks also has several inclusive meanings:
 Ancient Greeks, Greek people of the ancient era
 Byzantine Greeks, Greek people of the Byzantine era
 Ottoman Greeks, Greek people of the Ottoman era
 Pontic Greeks, Greek people of the Pontic region 
 Cappadocian Greeks, Greek people fron Cappadocia

The term may also refer to:
 Greeks (finance), a finance term
 The Greeks (book), 1951 non-fiction book by H. D. F. Kitto
 The Greeks (The Wire), criminal organization on the TV series The Wire

See also
 Greek (disambiguation)
 Macedonian Greeks (disambiguation)
 List of Jupiter trojans (Greek camp)